The 1978 United States Grand Prix was a Formula One motor race held on October 1, 1978, at the Watkins Glen Grand Prix Race Course in Watkins Glen, New York. This event was also referred to as the United States Grand Prix East in order to distinguish it from the United States Grand Prix West held on April 2, 1978, in Long Beach, California.

At the preceding Italian Grand Prix, Mario Andretti had secured the driver's championship.  At Watkins Glen, Andretti put his Lotus 79 on the pole before a record crowd of over 150,000 fans, but Ferrari's Carlos Reutemann completed a sweep of the two United States races in 1978 by finishing 19 seconds ahead of Australian Alan Jones. Andretti developed brake problems early on and would retire with a blown engine.

Summary

Background and practice sessions
Ronnie Peterson had been killed following a multiple car pile-up at the Italian Grand Prix.  Following the race, the Grand Prix Drivers' Association (GPDA) had a meeting centering on Riccardo Patrese, who the GPDA blamed for the crash. The GPDA filed an injunction to bar Patrese from participating in the 1978 United States Grand Prix weekend, which was allowed. Patrese, who believed that he was not to blame for the fatal accident at Monza, was furious at this action taken, and he tried unsuccessfully to stop the race from taking place.

Replacing the late Peterson for this race and the next one in Canada was Jean-Pierre Jarier.

Friday was warm and sunny, and Andretti set a new track record of 1:39.82. He later lowered that to 1:38.92, ahead of the Ferraris of Reutemann and Canadian rookie Gilles Villeneuve, then the two Brabhams of Niki Lauda and John Watson. American Brett Lunger, about to drive in his last Formula One race, was at the wheel of an Ensign for the first time, after his McLaren was damaged in the opening lap crash at Monza that claimed the life of Peterson. Bobby Rahal had been enlisted from Formula Atlantic to partner Jody Scheckter, as Canadian Walter Wolf was running two cars for the first time.

Starting carefully in his first F1 drive, Rahal took more than a second off his lap time in the Friday afternoon session, then another half-second on Saturday and qualified 20th. High winds on Saturday meant that only eight drivers improved their times, with Alan Jones jumping up to third spot on his last lap. Despite the wind, Andretti improved his pace-setting time to 1:38.114, more than a second ahead of Reutemann.

After Friday's qualifying, Andretti had been so pleased with his car that he said, "We don't know any more that we can do. She is so right. What can I say?" Race organizers feared that an Andretti win would trigger pandemonium in the massive crowd, and they had Mario and his wife, Dee Ann, pose for photos on the podium with the winner's trophy before the race.

Race

Sunday produced threatening skies, but no rain. On the last lap of the morning warm-up, the rear stub axle on Andretti's Lotus broke in the left-hander entering The Anvil (nicknamed "Ickx's Corner" after a crash the Belgian had there in 1976). The car spun several times and then hit the barrier, knocking off a rear wheel. Faulty material in the part was blamed, and, with no time to test the spare car, Andretti used his teammate Jean-Pierre Jarier's car for the race.

At the start, Andretti took the lead, while Emerson Fittipaldi and Héctor Rebaque (in 13th and 23rd places) both immediately burned out their clutches. Rebaque's race was over, but Fittipaldi managed to get his car in gear, nursed it around for a lap while it cooled off, and then drove through the field to finish fifth.

After one lap, Andretti had a four car-length lead over Reutemann and Villeneuve. They were followed by Jones, Lauda, Jarier, Hunt, Watson and Scheckter. Knowing the car had a brake problem, Andretti was hoping he could cope with it, as he had at Monza. Immediately, his lead began to disintegrate. On lap three, Reutemann went by, and on lap four, Villeneuve. As the Ferraris pulled away, Jarier came in on lap 11 from 11th place to change a deflating front tire. After going back out, the car was still bottoming, but once his fuel load lightened, he set the race's fastest lap, which would have qualified him third.

Nearing the halfway point, the Ferraris were running first and second. Then, on lap 23, Villeneuve's engine blew a piston, and Jones, who had overtaken Andretti two laps earlier, inherited second, 35 seconds behind Reutemann. On lap 25, Lauda passed Andretti for third, and three laps later, Andretti's engine blew. Scheckter and Jean-Pierre Jabouille's Renault were battling for fourth, which became third when Lauda also blew up just a lap after Andretti. Jarier was immediately behind them and closing rapidly.

When Jabouille ran into brake trouble, he was caught by both Scheckter and Jarier. Jarier went by both of them to take third, while Scheckter also passed Jabouille to regain fourth. Jarier's race ended with three and a half laps to go when he ran out of fuel, giving Scheckter the final podium position. Reutemann came home almost twenty seconds ahead of Jones to take the eighth Grand Prix win of his career, the third in the US. Jabouille's fourth place scored the first points for Renault and the first for a turbocharged engine; within a few years, turbocharged engines dominated Formula One.

Classification

Qualifying

*Positions in red indicate entries that failed to qualify.

Race

Championship standings after the race 

Drivers' Championship standings

Constructors' Championship standings

Note: Only the top five positions are included for both sets of standings.

References

Further reading
 Rob Walker (January, 1979). "19th United States Grand Prix: Mario Unlucky, Carlos Superb". Road & Track, 100-103.

United States Grand Prix
United States Grand Prix
1978 in sports in New York (state)
Grand Prix
Grand Prix